Architrypethelium hyalinum is a species of corticolous (bark-dwelling), crustose lichen in the family Trypetheliaceae. Found in Costa Rica and Brazil, it was formally described as a new species in 2008 by lichenologist André Aptroot. The type specimen was collected by Harrie Sipman from the Las Cruces Biological Station in Puntarenas. The lichen has a smooth to uneven, olive-green thallus. Its ascomata occur solitarily, have an apical ostiole, and measure 0.7–1.5 mm in diameter. Ascospores number 4 to 8 per ascus, have an oblong to ellipsoid shape with 3 septa, and measure 100–150 by 30–50 μm. These spores are among the largest of the 3-septate lichens in the Trypetheliaceae. Both the thallus and ascomata contain lichexanthone, a lichen product that causes these structures to glow yellow when lit with a long-wavelength UV light; A. hyalinum is the only species in genus Architrypethelium that contains lichexanthone.

References

Trypetheliaceae
Lichen species
Lichens described in 2008
Taxa named by André Aptroot
Lichens of Central America
Lichens of Brazil